La Mesilla is a census-designated place in Río Arriba County, New Mexico, United States. Its population was 1,772 as of the 2010 census.

In 1870, a family from La Mesilla was ambushed and killed by Mexicans disguised as Native Americans.

Geography
La Mesilla is located at coordinates . According to the United States Census Bureau, La Mesilla has a total area of 17.67 square kilometers, of which 17.57 km is land and (0.82%) 0.1 km is water.

Demographics

According to the 2010 census, 1772 people were living in La Mesilla. The population density was 151.9 inhabitants per square kilometer. Of the 1772 inhabitants, La Mesilla was composed by 68.34% White, 0.34% were African American, 1.35% were Native American, 0.4% were Asian, 0% were Pacific Islanders, the 25.62% were of other races and 3.95% from two or more races. Of the total population 73.36% were Hispanic or Latino of any race

Education
It is in Española Public Schools. The comprehensive public high school is Española Valley High School.

References

Census-designated places in New Mexico
Census-designated places in Rio Arriba County, New Mexico